Ollada (also named as  or  in the Valencian Community) is a traditional Catalan dish. Is based in boiling vegetables and meat in a casserole.

Ingredients
The ingredients can vary, but are based on vegetables (e.g., potato, carrot, artichoke etc.), legumes (beans, kidney beans, etc.) and embutido or butchery. 

In Roussillon, olada is a stew of potatoes, beans and cabbage or turnips, considered the most typical and traditional dish (with picolat balls and caracolada). The often-repeated saying "el ollada, bien porquejada" ("the pot and well pork") indicates what the fundamental ingredient is, the pork, with the vegetables of the season. In Vallespir they used to add barley. Like the Aranese pot, it is eaten all mixed, without discerning the broth to make soup, as is usually done with the bowl, and it is usually much thicker.

See also
Escudella

Catalan cuisine
Spanish cuisine
Spanish soups and stews
Potato dishes
Cocidos
Pork dishes

References